Erhun Obanor (born 5 September 1995) is a Nigerian professional footballer who plays as a defender for Greek Super League 2 club Proodeftiki.

Club career
A native of Benin City, Obanor is a product of the BJ Foundation Academy. He was loaned out at the start of the 2012-2013 season to the second-tier side COD United F.C. Mid-2013, he was loaned on to top-tier side Bendel Insurance., playing a season there before being sub-loaned to Abia Warriors F.C. until November 2015. In January 2016, Obanor signed a 3.5-year long contract with the Tunisian greats Club Africain, but had to cancel it and return to Nigeria because of dubious transfer fee reasons. In April 2016, he was loaned on by BJ Academy to MFM F.C.

Obanor moved abroad, however, already in July 2017, signing for SpVgg Greuther Fürth in Germany, joining the team in September of the same year, following  the 2016 Summer Olympics. However, he didn't break into the team, and found himself unable to get any playing time, his nationality preventing him from playing for the reserves. His contract was finally rescinded in the summer of 2018, and he moved to NK Rudeš in Croatia.

After two years playing in Albania for Kukësi and KF Laçi, Obanor returned to Croatia to sign for Istra in June 2021.

Having only accumulated a single league appearance for the Croatian side in 2021, Obanor was sent in January 2022 on loan to the Cypriot First Division side PAEEK until the end of the season.

International career
Obanor was a member of the Nigeria national football team. He was selected by Nigeria for their 35-man provisional squad for the 2016 Summer Olympics.

References

External links
 

1995 births
Living people
Nigerian footballers
Nigerian expatriate footballers
African Games bronze medalists for Nigeria
African Games medalists in football
Abia Warriors F.C. players
COD United F.C. players
SpVgg Greuther Fürth players
NK Rudeš players
FK Kukësi players
KF Laçi players
NK Istra 1961 players
Association football defenders
Expatriate footballers in Croatia
Expatriate footballers in Germany
Expatriate footballers in Albania
Nigerian expatriate sportspeople in Germany
Nigerian expatriate sportspeople in Croatia
Nigerian expatriate sportspeople in Albania
Croatian Football League players
Competitors at the 2015 African Games
Sportspeople from Benin City
Nigeria A' international footballers
2014 African Nations Championship players
Nigerian expatriate sportspeople in Cyprus
Expatriate footballers in Cyprus
PAEEK players